The Samuel Hays House, was designed by an unknown architect and constructed in 1892 for Samuel H. Hays in Boise, Idaho, USA. The house was remodeled by Tourtellotte & Hummel 1926–1927 to include six apartments. Part of Boise's Fort Street Historic District, the house was individually listed on the National Register of Historic Places November 17, 1982. At the time, the Fort Street Historic District also had been listed November 12, 1982.

Samuel Hays was an attorney who served as Idaho Attorney General during the administration of Governor Steunenberg. Hays also became mayor of Boise in 1916 and served until the 1919 election.

References

External links

Houses completed in 1927
Houses in Boise, Idaho
National Register of Historic Places in Boise, Idaho
Houses on the National Register of Historic Places in Idaho
Individually listed contributing properties to historic districts on the National Register in Idaho